Trude Harstad (born 17 July 1974) is a former Norwegian biathlete.

Life and career
Harstad was born in the municipality of Birkenes in the southern part of Norway.

Harstad debuted at the Junior World Championships in 1993 in Ruhpolding. The first event was the team event, which was not a success, as the Norwegian team composed of Harstad, Gunn Margit Andreassen and Liv Grete Skjelbreid came 9th. She did not race in the 10 km individual, but came 15th in the 7.5 km sprint. She was not a part of the relay team, which won gold. The following year in Brezno-Osrblie, Harstad won gold in the team event, alongside Karianne Væting, Liv Grete Skjelbreid and Eli Merete Melheim. She faltered in the individual events, finishing 16th in the 10 km individual and seventh, best of the Norwegians, in the sprint. Harstad finished with a bronze in the relay, having taken the anchor leg and racing with Liv Grete Skjelbreid and Karianne Væting.

In the World Cup, Harstad debuted in the fifth round of the 1992–93 World Cup in Östersund in Sweden. She finished 55th and did not return to the World Cup until the 1996–97 season. Harstad did not catch on and she only had a total of six starts in the World Cup, the best of which was two 53rds in Lillehammer in 1996–97. As she did not score any World Cup points, she did not have any overall placement in the total score of the World Cup.

At home, Harstad was more successful. She won 6 medals at the Norwegian Biathlon Championships, two of which were gold. Additionally, Harstad won 7 medals at the Junior Norwegian Biathlon Championships, of which four were gold.

Biathlon results

Junior World Championships
2 medals (1 gold, 1 bronze)

References

External links
 

1974 births
Living people
People from Birkenes
Norwegian female biathletes
Sportspeople from Agder
20th-century Norwegian women